Helene Caroline Therese (4 April 1834  16 May 1890), nicknamed Néné, was the Hereditary Princess of Thurn and Taxis as the wife of Maximilian Anton Lamoral. She was a Duchess in Bavaria by birth as the daughter of Duke Maximilian Joseph and Princess Ludovika. She was temporarily the head of the Thurn and Taxis family.

Helene’s maternal aunt, Princess Sophie of Bavaria, saw Helene as a good marriage candidate for her son, the future Austrian emperor Franz Josef, and in 1853, Helene, her mother, and her younger sister Elisabeth visited him in Bad Ischl. It was already presumed that Franz Josef would marry Helene, and when he decided to marry Elisabeth instead, Helene was distraught.

In 1858, Helene married Maximilian Anton, Hereditary Prince of Thurn and Taxis. After nearly nine years of marriage, Maximillian died due to a chronic kidney disease, leaving the Thrun and Taxis throne into the hands of Helene until their son reached majority.

Early life (1834–1858)

Childhood 
Helene Caroline Therese was the third child and eldest daughter of Maximilian Joseph, Duke in Bavaria and Princess Ludovika of Bavaria. She was nicknamed “Néné”.

As a child, Helene and her siblings enjoyed a more carefree and informal upbringing than what was customary for royal children at the time. Their family home during winter was Herzog Max Palais in Munich and Possenhofen Castle on Lake Starnberg during summer.

Helene was unusually pious, and would have fit into the Habsburg court well. She had one quality, though, that would not have been accepted: she was habitually unpunctual, and often missed trains and appointments.

Marriage prospects 
In 1853 Helene traveled with her mother, Ludovika, and her younger sister Elisabeth to the resort of Bad Ischl, Upper Austria, with the hopes that she would become the bride of her cousin Franz Josef, then the Emperor of Austria. He decided that he preferred Elisabeth instead, and a wedding between Helene and the emperor was not cemented.

After the failed engagement, Helene began to suffer from melancholia. Her mother soon became concerned that Helene would take the veil and join a convent. Helene had almost come to terms with remaining single. At 22 years old she was considered to be an "old maid", but her mother arranged for her to meet the wealthy Maximilian Anton Lamoral, Hereditary Prince of Thurn and Taxis. Duke Maximillian Joseph in Bavaria, Helene's father, invited the Thurn and Taxis family to the Possenhofen Castle for a hunting party, at which Prince Maximilian was introduced to Helene.

While the prince was vacationing at Possenhofen, he brought his marriage plans to his parents, who immediately agreed. The only difficulty involved was that although the Thurn and Taxis family were counted among the richest in the land, they were not considered social equals for a princess of royal blood and a member of the House of Wittelsbach. Because of this, King Maximilian II of Bavaria, who was also a cousin of Helene, did not at first agree to a marriage between the two, but through Elisabeth's influence on the king, the marriage took place nevertheless.

Marriage and later life (1858–1890) 

The wedding ceremony was held on 24 August 1858 at Possenhofen Castle. To mark the occasion, the in-laws gave the bride a necklace worth 160,000 Gulden. In spite of the earlier objections to the match, Helene is considered to have had the only happy marriage among the five Wittelsbach sisters. 

The first child, a daughter, who they named Louisa, was born in 1859, followed by a second daughter, Elisabeth, in 1860.  Shortly after the birth of her second child she traveled to Corfu to visit her sister Elisabeth, who was very ill. She returned by way of Vienna, where she reported to Franz Josef on the poor state of his wife.

Helene gave birth to the much-desired son in 1862, named Maximilian Maria, and in 1867 she gave birth to another son named Albert.

Even though the couple had a happy marriage, it was overshadowed by the severe illness of her husband, who had chronic kidney disease. Neither a course of treatment in Karlsbad nor the best doctors could save him. He died in 1867 at only 35 years of age.

Helene took her mind off her sorrows with charitable activities, and received the guardianship of her children from the Austrian emperor. Her father-in-law began to include her in the business affairs of the House of Thurn and Taxis, seeing in her a support and successor. In this way she became the head of the family until her oldest son reached his majority.

In 1883, her son, Maximilian, took over the leadership of the family business, he soon fell ill. His heart had been weakened by scarlet fever in childhood, and he suffered from severe heart spasms. In 1885, he died of a pulmonary embolism. This left Helene the family head again, until 1888 when her son Albert reached his majority and took over the family businesses. Helene then retired and dedicated herself to her religious devotions.

Death 
On 16 May 1890, at the age of 56, Helene died of stomach cancer.

Children

Honors

 : Dame of the Order of Queen Maria Luisa

Ancestry

Notes and references

Further reading
 Brigitte Hamann: Kaiserin wider Willen, 1981. 
 Conte Corti: Elisabeth. Die seltsame Frau, 1934. 
 Erika Bestenreiter: Sisi und ihre Geschwister, München 2004. 
 Sigrid-Maria Größing: Sisi und ihre Familie, Wien 2005.

External links

 Thurn-Taxis.com - Helene in Bavaria, a key person in the long history of the Thurn & Taxis Postal family

1834 births
1890 deaths
Nobility from Munich
House of Wittelsbach
German Roman Catholics
Hereditary Princesses of Thurn and Taxis
Duchesses of Bavaria
Burials at the Gruftkapelle, St. Emmeram's Abbey